Olivier Cotte (born 20 June 1963) is a French writer, graphic novel scriptwriter, animation historian, illustrator, and a director.

Biography
Born into a family of artists, Olivier Cotte studied piano, classical dance and fine arts in parallel with his philosophy degree. Passionate about animation, he made his first film at the age of 14. Fascinated by the aesthetics of John Cage and Merce Cunningham, he first wanted to become a contemporary dancer, but then enrolled in the fine arts and the Sorbonne in cinema and literature.

Beginnings in the cinema 
Olivier Cotte has worked for 15 years in the film and video industry as a director, computer graphics designer and special effects director for advertising, TV wraps, credits, clips, short films (Le canard à l'orange, 2002, by Patrick Bokanowski for example). He is a computer graphics designer or responsible for special effects for feature films, in particular for Wim Wenders (Until the End of the World), Roman Polanski (Death and the Maiden), Costa-Gavras (Mad City), Bob Swaim (The Climb), Josiane Balasko (Un grand cri d'amour), Jaco van Dormael (The Eighth Day), Leos Carax (Pola X), and Matthieu Kassovitz (Assassin(s)). He has directed several short films, mainly in animation or mixed techniques, including Terra Incognita (1995) in which he directs Michael Lonsdale.

Historian and theorist of animation cinema 
Since 2002, he has devoted himself to writing fiction and working as a historian of animation cinema. He teaches at Gobelins, l'école de l'image. He is the artistic and technical director of the opening shorts of the Annecy festival from 2002 to 2012. He also teaches at ESAG Penninghen, Esra, and abroad (Germany, China, Taiwan...). He collaborates with the reading committee of the Centre national du cinéma et de l'image animée and for many film festivals and cinematheques. From 2002 to 2012, he wrote the tributes to the missing of the year for the Annecy festival. He wrote many articles for different magazines dedicated to cinema, image and computer science, then several books dedicated to animation film including an encyclopedia 100 ans de cinéma d'animation and Le grand livre des techniques d’animation, two monographs dedicated to filmmakers (David Ehrlich, and Georges Schwizgebel), a book of study and interviews with directors awarded an Oscar. He has also translated the animator's bible The Animator's Survival Kit by Richard Williams and several technical books.

Screenwriter and author around the script 
Olivier Cotte had been the scriptwriter of a TV series Mr. TiVi in 1985, and had published some short stories, but it is from 2008 that he wrote several comics. With Jules Stromboni at the drawing, he published Le futuriste, mixing science fiction and fantasy, followed by two adaptations for the Casterman-Rivage collection: L'ultime défi de Sherlock Holmes and L'épouvantail. The post-apocalyptic universe will be developed with Xavier Coste for Le lendemain du monde. In a more humorous register, ; he releases with Martin Viot Memento Maurice at Editions du Long Bec in 2019. Olivier Cotte develops in his scenarios a predilection for imaginary universes, in particular science fiction and fantasy. This interest also leads him to collaborate with the Festival of Utopiales through evening classes and round tables. His passion for storytelling led him to write a screenwriting method, Writing for Film and Television, followed by Adapting a Book for Film and Television and Creating Characters for Films and Series, and to teach this subject in several schools such as Ispra. He has also translated Robert McKee's Dialogue: the Art of Verbal Action for Stage, Page and Screen and edited Story: Substance, Structure, Style and the Principles of Screenwriting by the same author. He's also a playwright and novelist.

Work

Graphic novels
 Le futuriste, (drawings by Jules Stromboni), Casterman, 2008
 L'ultime défi de Sherlock Holmes, (drawings by Jules Stromboni), Casterman, 2010.
 L'épouvantail, (drawings by Jules Stromboni), Casterman, 2012. Official selection Festival d'Angoulême 2013.
 Et si..., (drawings by Marion Delannoy) in Genre & Question féminine. Édition L’Oeuf, 2017.
 Le lendemain du monde, (drawings by Xavier Coste). Casterman, 2017.
 Memento Maurice, (drawings by Martin Viot). Editions du Long Bec, 2019.

Theater plays 
 Anamnèse de la chair, in Anthologie des Utopiales. Éditions ActuSF, 2018.
 Sequelles. 2021.

Novels 
 La momie qui aimait les pizzas et les jeux vidéo. Éditions Leha, 2021.

Short stories
 La prison, 1992
 Intersection-dissection, 1992
 Naître ou ne pas naître, 1992
 Petit traité du vide entre les étoiles, 1992
 La tarte aux pommes, 1992
 Ciel pur, 1992
 Le port, 1993
 Prise en passant, in Anthology 42, compiled by Jeanne-A Debats, Éditions Parchemins & Traverses, 2015.
 A la masse, in Anthologie Utop' jeunesse, Éditions ActuSF, 2021.

Film bibliography
 Il était une fois le dessin animé, an encyclopedia about worldwide animation.  Foreword by Jean-Claude Carrière. Dreamland, 2001, (out of print).
 Utiliser After Effects pour émuler une multiplane traditionnelle in Les cahiers du designer; les cahiers de Gobelins, l'école de l'image, collective work. Éditions Eyrolles, 2003.
 Réaliser un film sur After Effects in Les cahiers du designer; After-Effects, collective work. Éditions Eyrolles, 2004. Translated in espagnol: Conseguir animaciones y efectos especiales. Éditions CEAC tiempoLibre, 2005.
 Secrets of Oscar-winning Animation: Behind the scenes of 13 classic short animations. Focal Press, 2007. . In French: Les Oscars du film d'animation. Eyrolles, 2006. In Japanese: コマ撮りアニメーションの秘密―オスカー獲得13作品の制作現場と舞台裏. Editions Graphic-Sha, 2008. In corean: 오스카 애니메이션     올리비에 코트 | 역자: 나호원 | 다빈치. In Spanish: Los Oscars de dibujos animados, Ediciones Omega 2009.
 Chapters Le cinéma d’animation andt La typographie in Dictionnaire mondial des images, collective work. Nouveau Monde éditions, 2006.
 B is for Bordo, bilingual (English/Croatian) monograph, collective work. SKD Prosvjeta, Zagreb, 2006.
 La vidéo de A à Z: réalisez vos films comme un pro! Compétence Micro, 2007. In Spanish: Vídeo de la A à la Z: Crea peliculas como los profesionales. Know ware, PC-cuadernos, 2008.
 The beginnings of the Asifa in 50th Asifa Anniversary, The Animation Art and The History of Asifa, collectif. Asifa Publication (in english), 2011.
 Travaux pratiques avec After Effects. Editions Dunod, 2011.
 Mieux comprendre After Effects in Savoir tout faire en animation 2D et 3D, collective work. Éditions Oracom, 2011.
 Michaela Pavlatova in Animating the Unconscious, Desire, Sexuality and Animation, collective work. Wallflower Press, 2012.
 Les grandes fonctions d’After Effects in Savoir tout faire en vidéo: le Motion Design, collective work. Éditions Oracom, 2012.
 Écrire pour le cinéma et la télévision : Structure du scénario, outils et nouvelles techniques d'écriture créative. Editions Dunod, 2014.
 100 ans de cinéma d'animation, encyclopedia about worldwide animation. Éditions Dunod, 2015.
 french chapter writer in Animation - A World History de Giannalberto Bendazzi. Focal Press, 2015.
 Dark Vador vs Monsieur Spock (co-written with Jeanne-A Debats). Foreword by Alan Dean Foster. Éditions Dunod, 2016.
 Le grand livre des techniques du cinéma d'animation, Foreword by  Peter Lord. Éditions Dunod, 2018. 
 Adapter un livre pour le cinéma et la télévision - De l'oeuvre originale au scénario : roman, théâtre, biographie, bande dessinée. Éditions Armand Colin, 2020.
 Créer des personnages de films et de séries. Éditions Armand Colin, 2022.

Essay
 David Ehrlich, citizen of the world, bilingual (English/French) monograph. Dreamland, 2002. 
 Jorge Luis Borges, une autre littérature, by Jean-François Gérault. Collaboration to the filmography. Encrage/Les Belles Lettres, 2003.
 Georges Schwizgebel, animated paintings, trilingual (English/French/German) monograph. Heuwinkel, 2004. 
 Filmographie animée in Sciences & fictions à Peyresq, Citoyennetés spéculatives, collective work. Éditions du Somnium, 2016.
 La figure de Watson dans les adaptations audiovisuelles in Sherlock Holmes, un nouveau limier pour le XXIe siècle, collective work. PUR Rennes / Colloque de Cerisy, 2016.
 Rowing Across the Atlantic by Jean-François Laguionie in 40 Years of Ottawa: Collected Essays on Award-Winning Animation, collective work (in english). Ottawa festival edition, 2016.
 Tim Burton and the Animated Film in Tim Burton : A Cinema of Transformations, collective work (in english). Presses universitaires de la Méditerranée, 2018.
 L'animation engagée dans Less is more, collectif. Festival de musiques nouvelles, Philharmonie Luxembourg, 2019.
 Evolution and formal style in Portuguese animation dans Reframing Portuguese cinema in the 21th Century, collectif. Curtas Metragens, 2020.
 Adapter Dune, analyse d'un scénariste dans Dune, le Mook, collectif. Éditions L'Atalante & Leha, 2020.
 Repères biographiques dans Georges Schwizgebel, filmonographie, collectif. Monographie bilingue. La cinquième couche, 2020.
 Penny Dreadful, Who am I? dans Saison, la revue des séries – 1, n° 1. Classiques Garnier, 2021.

Translations 
 Techniques d'animation, translation of Richard Williams' book The Animator's Survival Kit. Eyrolles 2003.
 Créez vos propres animations en Stop Motion, translation of Melvyn Ternan's book. Dunod, 2014.
 Composer ses images pour le cinéma : Structure visuelle de l'image animée,  translation of Bruce Block's book. Éditions Eyrolles, 2014.
 Métier : Réalisateur - Quand les maîtres du cinéma se racontent, translation of Mike Goodridge's book. Éditions Dunod, 2014.
 Story - Ecrire des dialogues pour la scène et l'écran, translation of Robert McKee's book. Éditions Armand Colin, 2017.
 Story - Ecrire un scénario pour le cinéma et la télévision, technical correction of the previous translation of Robert McKee's book. Éditions Armand Colin, 2017.

Illustrations 
 Cover of the anthologie 42, compiled by Jeanne-A Debats, Éditions Parchemins & Traverses, 2015.
 Cover and inside illustration of Dark Vador vs Monsieur Spock (also co-written with Jeanne-A Debats. Dunod, 2016.
 Cover of the anthologie Frontières, compiled by Simon Bréan. Éditions Parchemins & Traverses, 2017.

Misc.
 Mac OS X Lion. Editions Oracom, 2012.
 Mac Office, collective work. Editions Oracom, 2012.
 La photo de portrait, collective work. Editions Oracom, 2012.
 Débuter et progresser en photographie, collective work. Editions Oracom, 2013.
 Le guide des usages Mac, collectif. Éditions Oracom, 2014.

newspapers : regular contributions
 iLive
 Création Numérique
 Pixel
 Le technicien du film
 CreaNum
 Movie Creation

Filmography
 Concerto pour une image, writer/director short film S8 mm., 1977
 Le justicier, writer/director short film 16 mm., 1984
 Monsieur TiVi script writer (animated TV series), 1984–85
 Documentary about CGI director (made for the Futuroscope), 1997
 Oniric séquence for "L'annonce faite à Marius", integrated in the feature film directed by Armelle Sbraire, 1997
 Terra Incognita, writer/director short film 35 mm interpreted by Michael Lonsdale, 1995
 Fukushima 'The Mermaid, director, short film, 2005
 Fukushima 'The Fox''', director, short film, 2006
 Fukushima 'Kohatayama, director, short film, 2006

DVD
Contribution to the bonus (interviews or booklets writing)Grave of the Fireflies (Isao Takahata). 2004, Wild Side VidéoJan Svankmajer Vol.1 (Jan Svankmajer). 2005, Chalet FilmsAstérix, the Gaumont trilogy (René Goscinny). 2005, Gaumont VidéoJan Svankmajer Vol.3 (Jan Svankmajer). 2007, Chalet FilmsNuvole e mani. Il cinema animato di Simone Massi. 2014, Minimum Fax.

Prizes
 Public prize at Imola festival for Terra Incognita Best script for L'ultime défi de Sherlock Holmes at Festi'BD 2011.
 Prix Lucioles BD 2011 for L'ultime défi de Sherlock Holmes.
 Award for Special Contribution to Animation Research'', at the World Festival of Animated Film - Animafest Zagreb in 2012.

External links
 Olivier Cotte official site
 
 A talk with Olivier Cotte at AWN website, July 2003

French comics writers
French film directors
Historians of animation
1963 births
Living people